is a Japanese adult visual novel developed and published by Akabeisoft2 on March 26, 2009.  The game was ported to Xbox 360 by 5pb. on June 3, 2010. The Xbox 360 version removed sexual content, but the graphics were increased to 1280x720 resolution and 5.1 surround sound was added. The gameplay in W.L.O. Sekai Renai Kikō is typical of a visual novel, following a plotline which offers pre-determined scenarios with courses of interaction.

A fandisc, W.L.O. Sekai Renai Kikō L.L.S. -Love Love Show- was released for PC on September 24, 2009.

Gameplay
Much of the gameplay requires little interaction from the player as the majority of the time is spent reading the text that appears on the game's screen. The text being displayed represents the thoughts of the characters or the dialogue between them. The player is occasionally presented with choices to determine the direction of the game. Depending on what is chosen, the plot may progress in a specific direction. The PC version contains scenes of the protagonist having sex with the heroines, but these were removed for the console version.

Music
The Xbox 360 version's opening theme song , by the group Afilia Saga East, was released as a CD single on April 28, 2010.

Reception
W.L.O. Sekai Renai Kikō won the gold prize in the character design category in the 2009 Moe Game Awards. It was Getchu's 22nd best selling game of 2009, and the fandisc was the 44th best-selling.

References

External links
official Xbox 360 website 
5pb. official World Love Organization website 
Akabeisoft2 Official Website 
In-depth article about the Xbox 360 version 

2009 video games
Bishōjo games
Visual novels
Japan-exclusive video games
Romance video games
Video games developed in Japan
Xbox 360 games
Eroge
Windows games
Single-player video games